Peng Shuai and Yang Zhaoxuan were the defending champions, but Yang chose to compete in Brisbane instead. Peng partnered Zhang Shuai, but lost in the first round to Jiang Xinyu and Tang Qianhui.

Barbora Krejčíková and Kateřina Siniaková won the title, defeating Duan Yingying and Zheng Saisai in the final, 6–2, 3–6, [10–4].

Seeds

Draw

Draw

References
Main Draw

WTA Shenzhen Open - Doubles
2020 Doubles